Wyoming's 39th House of Representatives district in the United States is one of 60 legislative districts included in the lower house of the Wyoming Legislature. It covers part of Sweetwater County, which compromises the Rock Springs—Green River—Wyoming Micropolitan Statistical Area.

Towns represented 
Rock Springs
Green River (county seat)

List of members representing the district

Recent election results

2022

2020

2018

2016

2014

2012

2010

2008

2006

2004

2002

2000

1998

1996

See also 
 Wyoming Legislature
 Wyoming House of Representatives
 Wyoming Senate

References

External links 

Wyoming House of Representatives districts